Bhildi Junction railway station is a major railway station in Banaskantha district, Gujarat, India on the Western line of the Western Railway network. Passenger, Express and Superfast trains halt here.

Nearby stations

Jasali is the nearest railway station towards , whereas Lorwada is the nearest railway station towards .

Trains

The following Express and Superfast trains halt at Bhildi Junction railway station in both directions:

 22483/84 Gandhidham–Jodhpur Express
 19151/52 Palanpur–Bhuj Intercity Express
 14805/06 Yesvantpur–Barmer AC Express
 14803/04 Bhagat Ki Kothi–Ahmedabad Weekly Express
 12489/90 Bikaner–Dadar Superfast Express
 14321/22 Ala Hazrat Express (via Bhildi)
 12959/60 Dadar–Bhuj Superfast Express
 14817/18 Bhagat Ki Kothi–Bandra Terminus Express (via Bhildi)

References 

Railway stations in Banaskantha district
Ahmedabad railway division
Railway junction stations in Gujarat